A suspensory ligament is a ligament that supports a body part, especially an organ.

Types include:
 Suspensory ligament of axilla, also known as Gerdy's ligament
 Cooper's ligaments, also known as the suspensory ligaments of Cooper or Suspensory ligaments of breast
 Suspensory ligament of clitoris
 Suspensory ligament of duodenum, also known as the ligament of Treitz
 Suspensory ligament of eyeball, also known as Lockwood's ligament
 Suspensory ligament of lens, also known as the zonule of Zinn or zonular fibre
 Suspensory ligament of ovary
 Suspensory ligament of penis
 Suspensory ligament of thyroid gland, also known as Berry's ligament
 Part of the suspensory apparatus of the leg of a horse. When the leg is supporting the horse's weight, this ligament supports the fetlock joint. Suspensory ligament injures are common in athletic horses.

References

Ligaments
Tissues (biology)